Maggi is both a surname and a given name. Notable people with the name include:

Surname 
Aimo Maggi (1756–1793), Italian painter of the Neoclassic periods
Amina Pirani Maggi (1892–1979), Italian stage and film actress
Angelo Maggi (born 1955), Italian actor and voice actor
Annibale Maggi, Venetian architect of the Renaissance period
Antonio Maggi (born 1932), Italian former tennis player 
Aymo Maggi (1903–1961), Italian racing car driver
Bartolomeo Maggi (1477–1552), Italian military surgeon
Blairo Maggi (born 1956), Brazilian politician and businessman, owner of the André Maggi Group, former governor of Mato Grosso
Carlo Maggi (Latinized Carolus Magius, d. ), Venetian citizen and traveller
Carlo Maria Maggi (1630–1699), Italian scholar, writer and poet
Carlos Maggi (1922–2015), Uruguayan lawyer, playwright, journalist and writer
Cesare Maggi (1881–1961), Italian painter
Diana Maggi (1925–2022), Italian-Argentine actress
Drew Maggi (born 1989), American professional baseball infielder
Émile Maggi (1908–1986), French racewalker
Fabio Maggi (born 1978), former professional tennis player from Italy
Giorgio Maggi (born 1997), Swiss professional racing driver
Girolamo Maggi ( – 1572), Italian scholar, jurist, poet, military engineer, urban planner, philologist, archaeologist, mathematician, and naturalist
Julius Maggi (1846–1912), founder of Nestlé's Maggi
Leopoldo Maggi (1840–1905), Italian physician, craniologist, and naturalist
Luigi Maggi (1867–1946), Italian actor and film director
Marco Maggi (born 1957), New York and Uruguay based artist
Maurren Maggi (born 1976), Brazilian athlete
Maria Maggi, a pseudonym used to conceal the identity of the corpse of Maria Eva Duarte de Peron while interred in Italy from 1955 to 1971
Maria Maggi, a terrorist involved with the Piazza della Loggia bombing
Ortensia Poncarale Maggi (1732–1811), Italian painter
Pietro Maggi (1680–1738), Italian painter of the late-Baroque period
Romina Maggi (born 1976), Argentine athlete
Sebastian Maggi OP (1412–1496), Blessed, Italian Roman Catholic priest and confessor to both Savonarola and St. Catherine of Genoa
Susan Maggi, Canadian film editor 
Xavier Vela Maggi (born 1989), Brazilian rower

Given name 
Maggi Dawn, British musician, author and theologian
Maggi Hambling (born 1945), British painter and sculptor
Maggi Kvestad (1921–2004), Norwegian speed skater
Maggi Lidchi-Grassi (born 1930), French writer and spiritual teacher
Maggi McNellis (1917–1989), American radio personality
Maggi Parker (born 1927), American actress
Maggi Payne (born 1945), American composer, flutist, and video artist
Margaret W. Weston, known as Maggi Weston, English-born photography collector and promoter

Surnames of Italian origin